Luang Pu Thuat (1582-1628 CE, 2125-2225 BE) was a Buddhist monk, born in Dee Luang sub district,Sathing Phra district, Songkhla, Thailand. He is a revered Buddhist monk who lived in Siam and is said to have performed miracles.

History
Luang Pu Thuat is mentioned in the early regional histories of southern Thailand, but his life is mainly preserved in oral traditions. Stories of the famous monk were passed on by word of mouth for centuries. As a result, it is a mixture of Buddhist elements: early signs, alleged magic, travel, study, meditation and eventual “sainthood.”

His movements throughout the southern Thai peninsula constitute a path of pilgrimage for many of his followers.

Luang Pu Thuat has also been said to have saved countless lives of people be it the battlefield, armed robbery or more with his sacred amulets.

Amulets
Many people in Thailand, Singapore and Malaysia believe that amulets depicting Luang Pu Thuat hold great protective powers granting safety in times of distress, especially saving the lives of believers from seemingly fatal automobile accidents. Phra Archan Tim Dharmataro, abbot of Wat Chang Hai is the pioneer creator of Phra Luang Phor Thuad amulets.

Older, sacred amulets of Pu Thuat are considered priceless and very powerful.

The first batch of Laung Pu Thuat amulets was made in 2497 BE (1954). It consisted entirely of amulets made from herbs (nua wan). This is the most famous batch of Laung Pu Thuat amulets because it was the first batch; it is referred to as the 2497 batch. All amulets were made of herbs and powder. Subsequently, more amulets were made and coin (rian) variations were added (2500, 2504 etc.). The next most famous batch of amulets was produced in 2505 BE. This batch is famous for the new type of Laung Pu Thuat amulet which was cast in the shape of a traditional iron. This type of amulet is called Lang Taolit. It is famous and highly sought after as it is the first time Lang Taolit amulets were made. There are two types of Lang Taolit - (1) with no words behind (lang taolit) (2) with words behind (lang taolit nang suer). *Nang Suer means book in Thai.

There are various moulds for producing the lang taolit (e.g. A, B, and C - with C being the lowest quality with features that were blurred). This is because the mould loses its shape and features as more amulets were made out of them.

Temples and Statues

Notes

References
3. http://bhagava-gallery.blogspot.co.id/search/label/*Phra%20LP%20Thuad?m=0

External links

 Luang Pu Thuat Legendary Guru Monk of Wat Chang Hai
 Luang Pu Thuat History
 Luang Phor Thuad - A legendary Thai Monk
 Wat Chang Hai Website

Thai Theravada Buddhist monks
1582 births
1682 deaths
Legendary Thai people